Zenzeli is a rural locality (a selo) and the administrative center of Zenzelinsky Selsoviet, Limansky District, Astrakhan Oblast, Russia. The population was 3,198 as of 2010. There are 33 streets.

Geography 
Zenzeli is located 25 km northwest of Liman (the district's administrative centre) by road. Mikhaylovka is the nearest rural locality.

World War 2 

Reconnaissance units from the German 16th Motorized Infantry Division reached Zenzeli in September of 1942. This was one of the furthest locations east reached by German forces.

References 

Rural localities in Limansky District